Major General Sam Kiwanuka (born c. 1965), is a senior military officer in the Uganda People's Defence Forces (UPDF), who serves as Uganda's Military Attaché to Ethiopia, based at Uganda's embassy in Addis Ababa.

Background and education
He was born in Uganda circa 1965. He attended primary school locally. He joined St. Peter's College Tororo to pursue secondary education. While there, he was recruited by the National Resistance Army (NRA) during the Ugandan Bush War. Following the end of that war, he was sent to the Tanzania Military Academy, in Monduli District, Arusha Region for military training. He has attended further military courses, both inside and outside Uganda.

Work experience
Sam Kiwanuka joined the NRA on 4 November 1981, when he was a 16 year old secondary school student. He was attached to the 9th NRA Battalion, under the command of Brigadier Julius Chihandae. The 9th battalion was deployed in Kabale District to guard against a possible attack by Uganda National Liberation Army soldiers from Rwanda.

After the end of that war, Kiwanuka was promoted to the rank of Captain and dispatched to Monduli Military Academy, in Tanzania, to attend a Company Commanders' Course. From there, he returned to Uganda and has served in UPDF operations in the Northern Region of Uganda and in South Sudan. Before his current assignment, he has served as Uganda’s military attaché to Kenya, South Sudan and Somalia.

Other considerations
In February 2019, over 2,000 UPDF men and women were promoted on one day. On that day Sam Kiwanuka was promoted from the rank of Brigadier to that of Major General.

See also
List of military schools in Uganda
African Union
Katumba Wamala
Kasirye Ggwanga
Elly Kayanja

References

External links
Museveni promotes over 2,000 UPDF Officers As of 8 February 2019.

1965 births
Living people
Ugandan military personnel
Ganda people
Ugandan generals
Tanzania Military Academy alumni
People from Central Region, Uganda